Malaysia competed in the 2020 Summer Paralympics in Tokyo, Japan from 24 August to 5 September 2021 which was postponed due to the COVID-19 pandemic.

Dato' Sri Megat D Shahriman Bin Dato' Zaharudin, president of the Malaysian Paralympic Council, is the chef de mission of the delegation.

Medalists

Background

Opening and closing ceremonies
Bonnie Bunyau Gustin and Siti Noor Iasah Mohamad Ariffin were flag bearers of Malaysia in the opening ceremony. In the Parade of Nations, both athletes and officials wore the Malay legendary warrior Hang Tuah inspired attire designed by the Department of fashion design and Art and Design Faculty of Universiti Teknologi MARA (UiTM) in Shah Alam (Main Campus). The attire, in the colours of the national flag, featured the "Songket Bunga Tabur" pattern. The female athletes and official wore the baju kurung complete with a dokoh (tiered pendant) and selendang (shawl), while the male athletes and officials wore the traditional Baju Melayu complete with an outer coat, a sampin and the Tengkolok (headgear).

Shuttler Cheah Liek Hou was named as flagbearer for the closing ceremony.

Target and achievement 
On 19 July 2021, Youth and Sports Minister Datuk Seri Reezal Merican Naina Merican announced that the Malaysian delegation to the 2020 Summer Paralympics had a target to win three gold medals, matching the medal haul of the previous edition in Rio de Janeiro, Brazil. Malaysia managed to achieve this target with three gold medals and two silver medals, totalling to 5 medals, making it the most successful outcome in Paralympic history, surpassing their record of four medals in the 2016 games.

Competitors
The following is the list of number of competitors in the Games:

Archery

Malaysia have qualified 2 quota for archery.
Men

Athletics

All male athletes have qualified from the 2019 World Para Athletics Championships at Dubai. They have qualified by being top 3 in each event. Malaysia have also entered 1 female athlete.

Men's track events

Men's field events

Women's track events

Badminton

Malaysia has qualified two para badminton players for each of the following events into the Paralympic tournament based on the Para Badminton World Rankings.

Men

Boccia

Chew Wei Lun get a ticket for Malaysia in Individual BC1 events.

Cycling

Malaysia sent three male and two female cyclists after allocations from the combined nations ranking.

Road
Men's road event

Women's road event

Track
Men's track event

Women's track event

Powerlifting

Bonnie Bunyau Gustin get a ticket for Malaysia in Mens 65kg event.

Swimming

Muhammad Nur Syaiful Zulkafli and Brenda Anellia Larry has successfully entered the paralympic slot after breaking the MQS.

Men

Women

Table tennis

Men's

Wheelchair tennis

Malaysia qualified one players entries for wheelchair tennis. Abu Samah Borhan qualified by the world rankings.

See also
Malaysia at the Paralympics
Malaysia at the 2020 Summer Olympics

References

Nations at the 2020 Summer Paralympics
2020
2021 in Malaysian sport